Nur Anzalna Md Nasir (born 9 January 1988) is a Malaysian actress and commercial model.

Early life

Anzalna is the second of five siblings and was born at Tasek Gelugor, Pulau Pinang on 9 January 1988. Anzalna grew up in many places. She did her primary school in Montreal, Quebec, Canada from 1996 to 1998 while following her father doing his master's degree at McGill University, Canada. Her first school was at Coronation Elementary School. She then moved to Sinclair Laird Elementary School followed by Bancroft Elementary School. Upon his father's completion of his study, she continued her primary school in her home country in Muar and Melaka. She then went to SMK Munshi Abdullah followed by SMK Khir Johari.

She left Malaysia in 2004 to follow her father undertaking his doctoral study at University of Tasmania, Australia. In Tasmania, she went to Brooks High School, Launceston before she went to Launceston College, Tasmania to further her study.

Filmography

Television series

Television movie

Film

Television show

Advertisement

 Trenz (Indonesia TV)
 Celcom
 Franch Oil
 Ecpi
 Safi Balqis

References

1988 births
Malaysian film actresses
Living people
Malaysian people of Malay descent
Malaysian Muslims
Malaysian people of Chinese descent
Malaysian people of Punjabi descent
21st-century Malaysian actresses
Malaysian television personalities
People from Penang